Max Prestwood Jr. is an American racing driver from Lenoir, North Carolina who won the NASCAR Weekly Series national championship in 1990.  He was a part-time Busch Series competitor from 1986 through 1990.

In 1990, driving two asphalt Late Models, a family-owned Chevrolet and a Jim Miller-owned Buick, Prestwood won 35 of the 40 races that he entered at Hickory Motor Speedway and Hudson, both in North Carolina.

References

External links
 

NASCAR drivers
People from Lenoir, North Carolina
Living people
Racing drivers from North Carolina
Year of birth missing (living people)